is a professional Japanese baseball player. He plays outfielder for the Chunichi Dragons. He previously played for the Yokohama DeNA BayStars.

On 9 December 2022, Hosokawa was traded to the Chunichi Dragons for Shōtarō Kasahara in the 2022 Current Player Draft.

References

External links

 NPB.com

1998 births
Living people
People from Atsugi, Kanagawa
Baseball people from Kanagawa Prefecture
Japanese baseball players
Nippon Professional Baseball outfielders
Yokohama DeNA BayStars players
Chunichi Dragons players